The Trafalgar St. James London, Curio Collection by Hilton is a contemporary boutique hotel located on the south side of Trafalgar Square in the City of Westminster, Central London, owned by London & Regional Properties.

Opened as The Trafalgar London in 2001, the hotel was Hilton's first unbranded property. It was later renamed The Trafalgar Hilton, before being rebranded The Trafalgar St. James London in August 2017, following a refurbishment to designs by SHH Architecture and Interior Design in which the number of rooms was increased to 131.

The historic structure was once used by the Cunard Steamship Company. The boardroom was used in feature films such as Dr. No and The Ipcress File.

The Trafalgar St. James is home to two restaurants including The Rooftop and Rockwell. Biblio is the hotel's 'house living room'.

References

External links
 official website
 official chain website

Hilton Hotels & Resorts hotels
Hotels in London
Hotels established in 2001